The following is the list of firsts in Southeast Asia.

Architecture 
The following are the first buildings of their type:

First philatelic museum in Southeast Asia - Singapore Philatelic Museum (19 August 1995)

Education 

 First university in Asia - University of Santo Tomas (1611) 

 First English medium school in Southeast Asia -  Penang Free School(1816) 
First Asian and Southeast Asian to be admitted to Harvard University - Fe del Mundo (1936)

Energy 

 First wind power farm in the region - Bangui Wind Farm (20 June 2005) 
 First nuclear power plant in the region - Bataan Nuclear Power Plant (1976)

Exploration 

 First Southeast Asian in space - Phạm Tuân (6 June 1980)

Entertainment and Media

Film

Awards 

 First Southeast Asian film to win Palme d'Or at Cannes - Uncle Boonmee Who Can Recall His Past Lives (2013) 
 First Southeast Asian to win Best Actress at Cannes - Jaclyn Jose (2016) 
 First Southeast Asian to win Best Director at Cannes - Brillante Mendoza (2009) 
 First Southeast Asian to win Volpi Cup for Best Actor at Venice Film Festival - John Arcilla (2021)

Journalism 

 First newspaper published in Southeast Asia - The Prince of Wales Island Gazette (1806) 
 First commercial television broadcast - Alto Broadcasting System (23 October 1953) 
 First Southeast Asian to win a Pulitzer Prize - Carlos Rómulo (1942)

Theater Arts 

 First Southeast Asian to win a Tony for Best Actress - Lea Salonga (1991)

Music 

 First Southeast Asian to win a Grammy - Larry Ramos (1963) 
First Southeast Asian act to be nominated at the Billboard Music Awards - SB19 (2021) 
First Southeast Asian act to top a Billboard Chart - SB19, Hot Trending Songs Chart (2021)

Finance & Commerce 

 First bank in Southeast Asia - El Banco Español Filipino de Isabel II (now Bank of the Philippine Islands) (1 August 1851)
 First beer brewery in Southeast Asia - La Fabrica de Cerveza de San Miguel (29 September 1890)

Literature 

 First Southeast Asian to win a Pulitzer Prize for Literature - Viet Thanh Nguyen (2016)

Medicine

Politics and Government 

 First President of UN General Assembly from Asia and Southeast Asia - Carlos P. Rómulo (1949) 
 First elected female President in Asia and Southeast Asia - Maria Corazon Aquino (1986) 
First recipient of Nobel Peace Prize from Southeast Asia - Technically: Lê Đức Thọ (1973), Officially: Aung San Suu Kyi (1991)

Science and Technology 

 First submarine assembled in Southeast Asia: KRI Alugoro (405) (2021)

Sports

Olympic Games 
First Southeast Asian to win a medal at the Olympics - Teófilo Yldefonso, swimming bronze (8 August 1928) 
 First Southeast Asian Olympic champion - Susi Susanti, badminton gold (4 August 1992)
 First Southeast Asian country to participate at the Summer Olympics - , 5 July 1924
 First Southeast Asian country to participate at the Winter Olympics - , 3 February 1972

World Championships 

 First male Artistic Gymnastics World Champion from Southeast Asia - Carlos Yulo, floor exercise (2019)

Others 

First professional basketball league in Asia and Southeast Asia - Philippine Basketball Association (9 April 1975)
 First Southeast Asian country to host the Asian Games - , 1 May 1954
First Southeast Asian country to host the Youth Olympic Games - , 14 August 2010

Transportation 

 First airport in Asia - Don Mueng International Airport (1914)
First Rapid transit system in Southeast Asia - Manila Light Rail Transit (1984)

References 

Southeast Asia
Firsts
Southeast Asia